Olsenella uli is a Gram-positive bacterium from the genus of Olsenella which has been isolated from the gingival crevice of humans. Olsenella uli can cause endodontic infections.

References

Further reading 
 
 

 

Coriobacteriaceae
Bacteria described in 1991